Blouin is a surname. Notable people with the surname include:

Anne Blouin (born 1946), Progressive Conservative party member of the Canadian House of Commons
Georges-Henri Blouin (1921-2007), former Canadian diplomat
Gustave Blouin (1912–2002), Canadian politician and manufacturer
Jocelyne Blouin (born 1950), Canadian meteorologist
Louise Blouin (born 1958), French-Canadian magazine publisher and philanthropist
Mike Blouin (born 1945), American politician, Democratic member of the United States House of Representatives
Sylvain Blouin (born 1974), retired professional ice hockey player

See also